Lukanja is a dispersed settlement in the Pohorje Hills in the Municipality of Slovenska Bistrica in northeastern Slovenia. Some of the Rogla ski resort facilities extend into the territory of Lukanja. The area is part of the traditional region of Styria. It is now included with the rest of the municipality in the Drava Statistical Region.

Mass grave
Lukanja is the site of a mass grave from the Second World War. It contains the remains of 40 German soldiers killed by an unknown Partisan unit in the summer of 1944.

References

External links
Lukanja at Geopedia

Populated places in the Municipality of Slovenska Bistrica